Archer is a city in O'Brien County, Iowa, United States. The population was 117 at the 2020 census.

History
Archer was founded in 1888. It was named for John Archer, who owned the town site.

Longstanding Mayor Bill Engeltjes oversaw the centennial celebration of 1988.  Replete with a parade, fashion show, street dance, and "greased pig" contest, the celebration honored Northwest Iowan heritage.

The town of Archer supports two churches: one Methodist and one Reformed.

Geography
Archer is located at  (43.115204, -95.744376).

Demographics

2010 census
As of the census of 2010, there were 131 people, 58 households, and 38 families residing in the city. The racial makeup of the city was 89.3% White, 3.1% Asian, 2.3% from other races, and 5.3% from two or more races. Hispanic or Latino of any race were 7.6% of the population.

There were 58 households, of which 27.6% had children under the age of 18 living with them, 56.9% were married couples living together, 6.9% had a female householder with no husband present, 1.7% had a male householder with no wife present, and 34.5% were non-families. 29.3% of all households were made up of individuals, and 15.5% had someone living alone who was 65 years of age or older. The average household size was 2.26 and the average family size was 2.79.

The median age in the city was 37.5 years. 26.7% of residents were under the age of 18; 2.3% were between the ages of 18 and 24; 25.9% were from 25 to 44; 19.8% were from 45 to 64; and 25.2% were 65 years of age or older. The gender makeup of the city was 50.4% male and 49.6% female.

The median income for a household in the city was $34,688, and the median income for a family was $39,167. Males had a median income of $26,375 versus $20,833 for females. The per capita income for the city was $15,958. There were no families and 1.6% of the population living below the poverty line, including no under eighteens and 6.1% of those over 64.

Education
Archer is served by the Sheldon Community School District.

References

Cities in Iowa
Cities in O'Brien County, Iowa